"Avaimet mun kiesiin" is the debut single by Finnish rapper Cheek featuring MasQ, taken from Cheek's first studio album Avaimet mun kulmille. Released on 3 March 2004, the song peaked at number six on the Finnish Singles Chart.

Chart performance

References

2004 debut singles
2004 songs
Cheek (rapper) songs
Sony Music singles